The 2002 Men's World Floorball Championships were the fourth men's Floorball World Championships. It was held from 18–25 May 2002 in Finland. Sweden won the tournament for a fourth time after defeating Finland in the final.

Championship results

Preliminary round

Group A

Group B

Playoffs

Quarter-finals

Semi-finals

Bronze medal match

Championship match

Placement round

5th–8th place matches

7th place match

5th place match

Leading scorers

Awards and all-star team
Goalkeeper:  Mårten Blixt
Defense:     Jari-Pekka Lehtonen,  Henrik Qvist
Forward:     Johan Andersson,  Jaakko Hintikka,  Martin Olofsson
Most Valuable Player (MVP):  Johan Andersson

Rankings

Official 2002 A-Division Rankings according to the IFF

External links 
Tournament Statistics
Official Website

Floorball Championships
Mens World Floorball Championships, 2002
Floorball
Floorball World Championships
International sports competitions in Helsinki
May 2002 sports events in Europe
2000s in Helsinki